Cover to Cover may refer to:

 Cover to Cover (1965 TV program), an American television program, featuring excerpts from outstanding children's books, that was broadcast on PBS from 1965 to 1996
 Cover to Cover (2005 TV program), an American television program hosted by Liz Claiman that was broadcast on the business channel CNBC
 Cover to Cover, an American daytime television program that aired on NBC in 1991
 Cover to Cover (Morse, Portnoy and George album), 2006
 Cover to Cover (The Jeff Healey Band album), 1995
 Cover to Cover tour, a 1991 tour by George Michael 
 Cover to Cover, a British audiobook publisher that was a predecessor of BBC Audiobooks